The people of the Solomon Islands observe these holidays nationally.

Public holidays 
 1 January: New Year's Day
 Variable Friday: Good Friday 
 Variable Saturday: Holy Saturday
 Variable Monday: Easter Monday
 Variable Monday: Whit Monday
 Second Friday of June: King's Official Birthday
 7 July: Independence Day
 25 December: Christmas Day
 26 December: National Day of Thanksgiving

Province Day
In addition to the national holidays each province has its own Province Day. If a Province Day falls on a Sunday, the public holiday is on the following Monday:

 25 February: Choiseul Province
 2 June: Isabel Province
 8 June: Temotu Province
 29 June: Central Province
 20 July: Rennell and Bellona Province
 1 August: Guadalcanal Province
 3 August: Makira-Ulawa Province
 15 August: Malaita Province
 7 December: Western Province

See also 
 List of holidays by country

References

 Excite UK

Solomon Islands culture
Society of the Solomon Islands
Solomon Islands
Events in the Solomon Islands
Holidays